Burlington Township is one of the 25 townships of Licking County, Ohio, United States. As of the 2010 census, the population was 1,223, up from 1,073 at the 2000 census.

Geography
Located on the northern edge of the county, it borders the following townships:
Miller Township, Knox County - north
Morgan Township, Knox County - northeast
Washington Township - east
McKean Township - south
Liberty Township - southwest corner
Bennington Township - west
Milford Township, Knox County - northwest corner

No municipalities are located in Burlington Township, although the unincorporated community of Homer lies in the township's north.

Name and history
It is the only Burlington Township statewide.

Government
The township is governed by a three-member board of trustees, who are elected in November of odd-numbered years to a four-year term beginning on the following January 1. Two are elected in the year after the presidential election and one is elected in the year before it. There is also an elected township fiscal officer, who serves a four-year term beginning on April 1 of the year after the election, which is held in November of the year before the presidential election. Vacancies in the fiscal officership or on the board of trustees are filled by the remaining trustees.

References

External links
County website

Townships in Licking County, Ohio
Townships in Ohio